Ineni (or Ini, Inni) was an ancient Egyptian queen who lived during the Thirteenth Dynasty (around 1700 BC).
She is so far only known from 21 scarabs and a seal impression from Kerma. She had the titles Great Royal Wife and she, who is united with the white crown. She is one of the first ancient Egyptian queens whose name was written within a cartouche. This approach to writing a name was previously only used for kings' names and some kings' daughters holding special positions. The name of Ineni's husband is not known with any certainty. It is thought that it was king Merneferre Ay, as her scarabs are similar in style to that of this king.

References

Bibliography 
 Wolfram Grajetzki: Ancient Egyptian Queens, London 2005, p. 40 
 Kim Ryholt: The Political Situation in Egypt during the Second Intermediate Period c.1800-1550 B.C. by Museum Tuscalanum Press, p. 38 (discussion of dating) 

18th-century BC women
Queens consort of the Thirteenth Dynasty of Egypt
Great Royal Wives